The 1955 San Diego mayoral election was held on April 19, 1955 to elect the mayor for San Diego. Incumbent mayor John D. Butler did not stand for reelection. In the primary election, Charles Dail and Harry L. Foster received the most votes and advanced to a runoff election. Dail was then elected mayor with a majority of the votes in the runoff.

Candidates
Charles Dail, former member of the San Diego City Council
Harry L. Foster
Jerome W. Rudrauff
Robert L. Stevenson
Gerard A. Dougherty
Sol Blanc
Emilio P. Adams
Richard L. Parsons

Campaign
Incumbent Mayor John D. Butler did not stand for reelection. On March 8, 1955, Charles Dail came first in the primary election with 39.4 percent of the vote, followed by Harry L. Foster with 27.5 percent. Because no candidate received a majority of the vote, Dail and Foster advanced to a runoff election. On April 19, 1955, Dail received 50.7 percent of the vote in the runoff and was elected to the office of the mayor.

Primary Election results

General Election results

References

1955
1955 in California
1955 United States mayoral elections
1955
April 1955 events in the United States